The International Journal on Media Management is a peer-reviewed academic journal published by Routledge from Taylor & Francis. It provides a global examination of the fields of media and telecommunications management, with a strong emphasis on management issues. The journal was established in 1999 with Beat Schmid as founding editor. Alan B. Albarran became its second editor. Since 2015, its editor-in-chief has been Bozena Mierzejewska (Fordham University).

Editors 
The following persons have been editor-in-chief of the journal:

Indexing
The International Journal on Media Management is currently indexed in:

References

External links 
 

English-language journals
Media studies journals
Publications established in 1999
Quarterly journals
Taylor & Francis academic journals